The Domestic Terrorism Prevention Act was a proposed law that would have created domestic terrorism offices within the Department of Homeland Security (DHS), the Department of Justice (DOJ), and the Federal Bureau of Investigation (FBI).

Legislative history 
On May 18, 2022, the Act passed the House in a 222–203 vote, with only one Republican, Adam Kinzinger (IL), voting in favor of the Act. A previous version of the Act had passed unanimously in the House in 2020. The 2022 version of the Act was proposed in response to the Buffalo Tops shooting that was motivated by racism. On May 26, Senate Republicans blocked the bill in a 47–47 vote, arguing that the bill created redundant offices and portrayed law enforcement as white supremacists.

Reception 
Republicans have opposed the 2022 version of the Act, comparing it to the recently paused Disinformation Governance Board (DGB) and saying that the Act could be used to censor conservatives with anti-government, anti-immigration, and anti-illegal immigration views. Republicans also argued that the measure duplicated already existing efforts by American law enforcement while also risking targeting individuals unfairly as political extremists. Democrats noted the tough polarization in Congress while arguing that the Republicans failed to compromise on pragmatic changes to fight gun deaths.

American socialist magazine Jacobin argued that the Act could be used to target members of the political left, since the Biden administration's counter-terrorism strategy "makes no distinction based on political views" and says that domestic terrorists are motivated by a "range of ideologies" that includes animal rights, environmentalism, anarchism, and anti-capitalism.

See also 

 Crime in the United States
 Domestic terrorism in the United States

References 

Proposed legislation of the 116th United States Congress
Proposed legislation of the 117th United States Congress
Terrorism laws in the United States
United States federal criminal legislation
United States federal defense and national security legislation
May 2022 events in the United States
September 2020 events in the United States